National Assembly elections were held in Kenya as part of the general election on 4 March 2013. Under the new constitution, which was passed in a 2010 referendum, the 2013 elections were the first run by the Independent Electoral and Boundaries Commission. The constitution provided for 290 National Assembly seats directly elected by geographic constituencies, 47 seats for county woman representatives and 12 nominated representatives. A speaker was chosen to serve as an ex officio officer.

Results summary

Members

Constituency members (290)

Women County Representatives (47)

Nominated Representatives (12)

Changes during term

By-elections

References

Lists of members of the National Assembly of Kenya by term